Oreopanax grandifolius is a species of plant in the family Araliaceae. It is endemic to Ecuador.  Its natural habitat is subtropical or tropical moist montane forests. It is threatened by habitat loss.

References

grandifolius
Endemic flora of Ecuador
Near threatened plants
Taxonomy articles created by Polbot